Saint John Lancaster is a provincial electoral district for the Legislative Assembly of New Brunswick, Canada. The MLA has been Dorothy Shephard since 2010.

The riding name refers to Lancaster, New Brunswick.

Members of the Legislative Assembly

Election results

See also

References

External links 
Website of the Legislative Assembly of New Brunswick

New Brunswick provincial electoral districts
Politics of Saint John, New Brunswick